Dominic Barry (born 7 March 1994) is a former professional Australian rules footballer who played for the Melbourne Football Club and the Port Adelaide Football Club in the Australian Football League (AFL). 

Barry was initially a  recruit as part of their zone recruiting, however, he was on-traded to Melbourne, which saw Melbourne also land Jesse Hogan in exchange for picks 3 and 13 during the 2012 trade period.

At the end of the 2013 season, Barry represented Australia in the 2013 International Rules Series against Ireland, despite having not played an AFL game.

He played five games for 2014 before notifying Melbourne at the start of the pre-season that he had lost the desire to play AFL and would be returning to Central Australia to focus on his family and cultural identity.

In 2016, Barry began playing with Glenelg in the South Australian National Football League (SANFL). He had spent 2015 as a school bus driver and playing local football in Anangu Pitjantjatjara Yankunytjatjara. After one season with Glenelg, Barry nominated for the 2017 AFL draft and was taken by Port Adelaide with selection number 61.

Statistics
  Statistics are correct to the end of the 2014 season

|- style="background-color: #EAEAEA"
! scope="row" style="text-align:center" | 2014
|style="text-align:center;"|
| 33 || 5 || — || 1 || 19 || 19 || 38 || 6 || 7 || — || 0.2 || 3.8 || 3.8 || 7.6 || 1.2 || 1.4
|- class="sortbottom"
! colspan=3| Career
! 5
! 0
! 1
! 19
! 19
! 38
! 6
! 7
! 0.0
! 0.2
! 3.8
! 3.8
! 7.6
! 1.2
! 1.4
|}

References

External links

Dom Barry's profile from DemonWiki
  

1994 births
Living people
Australian rules footballers from the Northern Territory
Melbourne Football Club players
Casey Demons players
Indigenous Australian players of Australian rules football
Northern Territory Football Club players
Waratah Football Club players
People educated at St Patrick's College, Ballarat
Glenelg Football Club players
Australia international rules football team players
Port Adelaide Football Club players
Port Adelaide Football Club players (all competitions)